Minister for Environment, formerly Minister for the Environment is a position in the government of Western Australia,  held by Amber-Jade Sanderson.

The position was first created in December 1970, in what would be the last months of the government of Sir David Brand. It has existed in every government since then, sometimes under different titles. The minister is responsible two state government departments – the Department of Environment Regulation and the Department of Parks and Wildlife.

Titles
 10 December 1970 – 8 April 1974: Minister for Environmental Protection
 8 April 1974 – 25 February 1983: Minister for Conservation and the Environment
 25 February 1983 – 2008: Minister for the Environment
 2009 –: Minister for Environment

List of ministers

See also
 Minister for Agriculture and Food (Western Australia)
 Minister for Fisheries (Western Australia)
 Minister for the Environment and Water (Australia)
 Minister for the Environment (Victoria)
 Minister for Environment and Natural Resources (Northern Territory)
 Minister for Environment and Heritage

References

 David Black (2014), The Western Australian Parliamentary Handbook (Twenty-Third Edition). Perth [W.A.]: Parliament of Western Australia.

Fisheries
Minister for Fisheries
Environment of Western Australia